The striated swallow (Cecropis striolata) is a species of swallow found in open, often hilly, areas with clearings and cultivation across Southeast Asia to northeastern India and Taiwan.

The striated swallow was formerly sometimes considered a subspecies of the red-rumped swallow.

Description
The striated swallow is 19 cm long with a deeply forked tail. It has blue upperparts other than a reddish collar (sometimes absent) and streaked chestnut rump. The face and underparts are white with heavy dark streaking. The wings are brown. The sexes are alike but juveniles are duller and browner, with a paler rump and shorter outer tail feathers.

There are four races:

C. s. striolata breeds in Taiwan, the Philippines and Indonesia.
C. s. mayri breeds from northeastern India to northwestern Myanmar and northeastern Bangladesh. It has broader streaks than nominate striolata.
C. s. stanfordi breeds from northeastern Myanmar to northern Thailand. It has broad streaks.
C.  s. vernayi breeds locally in western Thailand.  It is more rufous below than the nominate race, and is only faintly streaked on the rump.

This species,  particularly subspecies mayri, is very similar to the red-rumped swallow of the race japonicus, but is larger, more heavily streaked, and has a less distinct neck collar.

Behavior

The contact call is pin, the alarm is chi-chi-chi, and the song is a soft twittering.

Migration
The island subspecies are essentially resident, but the continental races mayri  and stanfordi are partial migrants which move south in the winter.

Breeding
The striated swallow breeds from April to July alone or semi-colonially with scattered nests. The nest is a retort or bottle-shaped structure, made from mud pellets and lined with dried grasses and feathers. The clutch is usually four, sometimes five, white eggs. Both sexes build the nest, and share incubation and the care of the young.

Nests are constructed in natural caves, but very often in artificial sites on bridges, in culverts and on buildings.

Feeding
The striated swallow feeds low over the ground or at cliff faces on flying insects. It has a slow buoyant flight compared to the barn swallow. It will feed with other swallow species.

References

  

Robson Birds of Thailand 

striated swallow
Birds of Northeast India
Birds of Southeast Asia
Birds of Taiwan
Birds of Yunnan
striated swallow